Maher al-Assad (born 8 December 1967) is a Syrian general and commander of the Republican Guard and the army's elite Fourth Armoured Division, which together with Syria's secret police form the core of the country's security forces. He is also a member of the Central Committee of the Ba'ath Party's Syrian Regional Branch. He is thought by some to be the second-most powerful man in Syria after his brother Bashar, the current President.

Maher is described by analysts as preferring Iran (as opposed to Russia) to play the largest role as the Syrian Government's main ally during the Syrian Civil War and subsequent post-war reconstruction. This is in contrast to the position of Major General Suheil al-Hassan, commander of the Division 25 Special Mission Forces who has gained much influence as a result of his activities during the Syrian Civil War, who was reported as preferring Russia.

Early life and education 
Maher al-Assad was born on 8 December 1967, the youngest child of Anisa Makhlouf and Hafez al-Assad. He was just two years old when his father became President of Syria. Like the other children in the al-Assad family, he was raised out of the public spotlight and trained in Syria.

Maher went to the Academy of Freedom School for his secondary education and then studied business administration at Damascus University. Following university he pursued a career in the military like his older brother Bassel.

When Bassel died in a car crash in 1994, Maher was mentioned as a possible successor to Hafez, but in the end, Bashar succeeded his father even though he lacked the military experience and political ambition. It was speculated that Maher's reputation as a hot-tempered person influenced the decision in favour of Bashar.

Business activities 
Maher al-Assad operates a number of different business projects in Lebanon with his cousin Rami Makhlouf. Shmuel Bar argues that there was a split between the two of them, because the Makhloufs were worried that they were going to be made the scapegoats of an anti-corruption propaganda campaign. Maher for a while controlled online media site Cham Press.

Money laundering 
On 23 May 2011, the EU placed sanctions for providing funding to the government which allowed violence against demonstrators during the Syrian civil war. According to Fortune Magazine, Maher benefited from the billion dollar money laundering operation at the Lebanese al-Madina bank which collapsed in 2003 at the start of the Iraq War. Al Madina was used to launder kickback money of Iraqi officials and their partners in the illegal gaming of the UN's oil-for-food programme. Sources put the amount transferred and laundered through al-Madina at more than $1 billion, with a 25 percent commission going to Syrian officials and their Lebanese allies; among the recipients of this money was Bashar Assad's brother Maher.

Al Madina bank records indicate that Maher's office manager, Khalid Qaddur, was transferred at no cost a Beirut apartment valued at $2.5 million, a transfer that investigators believe was intended to put it under Maher's control. The entire file on the Madina bank collapse is at the Lebanese Ministry of Justice, except for key parts that implicate Maher, which are still at the Lebanese Central Bank because people fear being killed over it. On 23 June 2011, the EU placed sanctions on Maher's office manager, Khalid Qaddur, for providing funding to the government which allowed violence against demonstrators during the Syrian uprising. Similar sanctions were also placed on Ra'if al-Quwatli, another business associate of Maher.

Drug trade 
The New York Times reported in December 2021 that the 4th Armoured Division, commanded by Maher al-Assad, oversees much of the production and distribution of Captagon, among other drugs, reinforcing Syria's status as a narco-state on the Mediterranean sea. The unit controls manufacturing facilities, packing plants, and smuggling networks all across Syria (which have started to also move crystal meth). The division's security bureau, headed by Maj. Gen. Ghassan Bilal, provides protection for factories and along smuggling routes to the port city Latakia and to border crossings with Jordan and Lebanon.

Military career 
After Basil's death in 1994, Maher assumed command of a brigade in the Republican Guard. His time as brigade commander allowed him to gain valuable military experience and build personal ties with his officers. After the death of his father in 2000, he was promoted from major to lieutenant colonel. Maher subsequently became commander of the Republican Guard, a 10,000 strong unit whose loyalty is said to be guaranteed by the significant share of revenue that it receives from the oil fields in the Deir ez-Zor region, and the commander of the army's elite Fourth Armored Division which was once his uncle Rifaat Assad's Defense companies.

In June 2000, Maher was elected to the Central Committee of the Ba'ath Party's Syrian Regional Branch and subsequently was influential in persuading his brother Bashar during the first few months of his rule to put an end to the political openness of the short lived Damascus Spring. Three years later Maher Assad met in Jordan with Israeli businessman Eitan Bentzur, a former director-general of the Israeli Foreign Ministry, and offered to reopen peace negotiations with Israel without preconditions. The offer was rejected by Arial Sharon, the Prime Minister of Israel.

Maher often appeared in public with Bashar and is said to be one of his closest advisers. He competed with Assef Shawkat, who was married to his sister Bushra al-Assad and was head of military intelligence, for influence in the Assad government. Maher was opposed to Shawkat's marriage to his sister Bushra, and had Shawkat imprisoned on several occasions to keep them apart. In October 1999, he was rumoured to have shot Shawkat in the stomach during an argument. Assef survived, and the two were said to have good relations then. Bashar, Maher, and Assef were said to form the inner circle of power in the Assad government.

Both Shawkat and Maher al-Assad were mentioned in a leaked draft version of the Mehlis report as suspects in the 2005 murder of former Lebanese prime minister Rafik Hariri. According to the draft version, "one witness of Syrian origin but resident in Lebanon, who claims to have worked for the Syrian intelligence services in Lebanon, stated that approximately two weeks after the adoption of Security Council resolution 1559, Maher Al Assad, Assef Shawkat, Hassan Khalil, Bahjat Suleyman and Jamil Al Sayyed decided to assassinate Rafik Hariri."

In 2008, Maher was in charge of putting down a prison revolt in Saidnaya, where 400 soldiers had been kidnapped by the prisoners. Around 25 people out of 10,000 inmates were killed during the crackdown. Human rights groups had unverified video footage that purportedly shows Maher taking photographs with his mobile phone of the dismembered bodies of prisoners after the riot. Maher's sister-in-law, Majd al-Jadaan, who lives in exile in Washington DC, claims that the individual in the video footage is Maher. In 2016 and 2017, there where conflicting reporting regarding his, Maher's rank, if he was a brigadier general or major general.

In April of 2018, he was made the head of Syria's elite 4th Armoured Division, which oversees, amongst other things, the activities of the armed Alawite militia known as the Shabiha. He had previously been the commander of the 42nd battalion within the division.

Syrian Civil War 

Since the beginning of the Syrian uprising in mid-March 2011, Maher's troops have played a key role in violently suppressing protests in the southern city of Daraa, the coastal city of Banias, the central province of Homs and the northern province of Idlib. The Los Angeles Times reported that video footage existed, which activists and observers claimed showing Maher personally shooting at unarmed protesters, who were demanding the fall of the Assad government in the Barzeh suburb of Damascus. Defecting soldiers under Maher's command reported they were given orders by him to use deadly force against unarmed protesters. One defecting sniper reported that during the protests in Deraa: "We were ordered to aim for the head or heart from the beginning. We were not given specific numbers but told to kill as many as possible as long as there were protests."

Prime Minister of Turkey, Recep Tayyip Erdogan, stated that Maher's actions during the Syrian uprising approached "savagery", and he pressured Bashar Assad to remove Maher from command of the military and to send him into exile. The United States on 27 April 2011 placed sanctions on Maher for being a facilitator of human rights violations in Syria. Two weeks later, on 10 May 2011, the EU sanctioned Maher for being the principal overseer of violence against demonstrators during the Syrian uprising. The Arab League issued a list of nineteen Syrian officials banned from travelling to Arab countries and whose assets were being frozen by those countries. Among those named were Assad's brother, Maher Assad, his cousin and telecom magnate Rami Makhlouf, as well as military and intelligence figures. On 2 December 2011, Maher was also placed on a travel ban.

Maher Assad's role became more significant following the assassination of the Syrian defense minister, high-ranking security officials and Assef Shawkat on 18 July 2012. After a four-day siege by the opposition forces from 18 to 22 July 2012, the 4th Armoured Division, commanded by Maher Assad, swept through three rebel-held districts of Damascus.

In August 2012, Saudi newspaper Al-Watan claimed that Assad was willing to step down and that his brother Maher had lost his legs in the 18 July 2012 Damascus bombing, allegedly quoting the Russian deputy foreign minister Mikhail Bogdanov. The information was immediately denied in Russian media. The daily then released an audio of the claimed conversation, but the voice reportedly did not sound like Bogdanov's. Other sources, including a Western diplomat, said they had heard Maher lost a leg.

A July 2013 report by a pro-government websites stated that Maher was commanding troops in the Aleppo and Homs theatre of operations.

Sanctions 
In April 2011, United States President Barack Obama issued Executive Order 13572 blocking property of Maher al-Assad with respect to human rights abuses in Syria.

Controversies

Rumoured death 
On 20 August 2012, rumours surfaced that Maher, who had not been seen since 18 July 2012 Damascus bombing, succumbed to his injuries after RT reported that a senior Syrian military official died in a hospital in Moscow. After the report was released, Syrian state media denied it was true. A member of the pro-opposition Syrian National Council, Mohammad Mahzeh, claimed he and other members were 100% certain it was true and Maher was the Syrian military official who died in Moscow.

However, on 10 October 2012, Abdullah Omar, a defected Syrian journalist, told CNN that Maher was treated in Russia but returned to the presidential palace, where al-Omar said that Maher had lost his left leg in the bombing and also the use of his left arm.

A photo of Maher Al-Assad with singer George Wassouf from June 2014 was published by a Lebanese TV presenter, confirming that he is alive.

Personal life 
Maher is married to Manal al-Jadaan, a Sunni woman with whom he has two daughters and one son. His marriage to a Sunni woman, like his brother Bashar, strengthened his business connections with the Sunni elite. According to the GlobalPost Maher is considered by those who know him too hot-tempered to be an effective ruler. In addition, The GlobalPost said that Maher caused his sister-in-law, Majd al-Jadaan, to leave Syria in August 2008 due to ongoing disagreements.

See also 
Al-Assad family
Presidency of Hafez al-Assad

References

External links 

 Death of Maher al-Assad

1967 births
Living people
Damascus University alumni
Maher al-Assad
People from Damascus
Syrian generals
People of the Syrian civil war
People indicted for war crimes
Sons of national leaders
Arab Socialist Ba'ath Party – Syria Region politicians
Syrian individuals subject to U.S. Department of the Treasury sanctions
Syrian individuals subject to the European Union sanctions
Syrian money launderers
Syrian white-collar criminals